Danielle Schubach (born 28 April 1988) is a former Australian field hockey player.

Personal life
Danielle Schubach was born and raised in Altona, Victoria.

Career

State level
At Australian level, Schubach plays representative hockey for her home state Victoria in the Australian Hockey League.

With the Victorian Vipers, Schubach won two national titles, in 2012 and 2017.

National teams

Under–21
Danielle Schubach first represented Australia at a junior level, when she debuted for the Australia U–21 side in 2009. Her first appearance was at the 2009 Australian Youth Olympic Festival in Sydney. Later that year, she was selected in the team for the Junior World Cup in Boston, where the team finished fifth.

Hockeyroos
In addition to her junior debut, Schubach also made her senior international debut for the Hockeyroos in 2009, during a test match against South Africa in Durban. Schubach went on to represent the team at the Spar Cup, with matches against Argentina, India and South Africa.

Following her 2009 debut, Schubach did not represent Australia again until 2013 when she was called into the team for the Investec Cup in Cape Town. This would also be her last appearance for the Hockeyroos.

References

External links
 
 

1988 births
Living people
Australian female field hockey players
People from Altona, Victoria
Field hockey players from Melbourne
Sportswomen from Victoria (Australia)
21st-century Australian women